According to various polls, the majority of Kazakhstan's citizens, primarily ethnic Kazakhs, identify as Sunni Muslims, Less than 1% are part of Shi'a. There are a total of 2,900 mosques, all of them affiliated with the "Spiritual Association of Muslims of Kazakhstan", headed by a supreme mufti. The Eid al-Adha is recognized as a national holiday.

Less than 25% of the population of Kazakhstan is Russian Orthodox, traditionally including ethnic Russians, Ukrainians and Belarusians. Other Christian groups include Catholics and Protestants (Baptists, Presbyterians, Lutherans, Pentecostals, Methodists, Mennonites and Seventh-day Adventists), including restorationist Christian faiths such as Jehovah's Witnesses and The Church of Jesus Christ of Latter Day Saints. There are a total of 175 registered Orthodox churches, 53 Catholic churches, and 343 Protestant churches and prayer houses. Christmas, rendered in the Russian Orthodox manner according to the Julian calendar, is recognized as a national holiday in Kazakhstan.

Other religious registered groups include Judaism, the Baháʼí Faith, Hinduism, Buddhism, the Church of Scientology, Christian Science, and the Unification Church.

Since independence, the number of mosques and churches has increased greatly. However, the population is sometimes wary of minority religious groups and groups that proselytize. There were several reports of citizens filing complaints with authorities after their family members became involved with such groups. Leaders of the four religious groups the government considers "traditional" – Islam, Russian Orthodoxy, Catholicism, and Judaism – reported general acceptance and tolerance that other religious groups did not always enjoy.

According to the estimate by the Pew Research Center, 72% of the population practices the religion of Islam. It also estimated that 23.1% practices Christianity, 4% are unaffiliated, and 0.9% of the population practices other religions, mainly Buddhism and Folk Religion.

Religious history 

The country has historically hosted a wide variety of ethnic groups with varying religions. Intolerance to other societies has become an issue of the Kazakh culture. The foundation of an independent republic, following the disintegration of the USSR, has launched a great deal of changes in every aspect of people's lives. Religiosity of the population, as an essential part of any cultural identity, has undergone dynamic transformations as well.

Baptist Churches are often raided. This is due to the church members gathering without registering themselves, a requirement of the country. Anyone who does not register risk being raided by the police. However not only those that violate the law are treated harshly.

On May 2, 2017, a court in the capital of Astana, Kazakhstan, sentenced a 61-year-old husband and father of three sons to a five-year prison sentence for performing peaceful Bible education work. Teymur Akhmedov, is a member of Jehovah's Witnesses. The court called his preaching and teaching efforts “inciting religious discord” and “advocating [religious] superiority.” In addition, the judge also imposed a three-year ban on Mr. Akhmedov’s participation in Bible education activities. Mr Akhmedov's medical issues were not considered, as he requires treatment for a bleeding tumor and has been denied the medical attention that he requires.

After decades of suppressed culture, the people were feeling a great need to exhibit their ethnic identity – in part through religion. Quantitative research shows that for the first years after the establishment of the new laws, waiving any restrictions on religious beliefs and proclaiming full freedom of confessions, the country experienced a huge spike in religious activity of its citizens. Hundreds of mosques, synagogues, churches, and other religious structures were built in a matter of years. All represented religions benefited from increased number of members and facilities. Many confessions that were absent before independence made their way into the country, appealing to hundreds of people. The government supported this activity, and has done its best to provide equality among all religious organizations and their followers. In the late 1990s, however, a slight decline in religiosity occurred. The draft religion law being considered in June 2008 has raised international concern over whether there is an intention to meet general standards of freedom of religion and human rights.

Faiths

Islam 

Islam is the most commonly practiced religion in Kazakhstan; it was introduced to the region during the 8th century by the Arabs. Traditionally ethnic Kazakhs are Sunni Muslims who mainly follow the Hanafi school. Kazakhs including other ethnic groups of Muslim background make up over 90 per cent of all Muslims. The southern region of the country has the highest concentration of self-identified practicing Muslims.

Christianity 

Christianity in Kazakhstan is the second most practiced religion after Islam. Most Christian citizens are Russians, and to a lesser extent Ukrainians and Belarusians, who belong to the Russian Orthodox Church. According to a 2009 national census, approximately 26% of the population of Kazakhstan identifies as Christian. 1.5 percent of the population is German, most of whom follow Catholicism or Lutheranism. There are also many Presbyterians, Seventh-day Adventists, and Pentecostals. Methodists, Mennonites, also Mormons have also registered churches with the government. According to the 2009 census, there were 4,214,232 Christians in Kazakhstan. "Kazakhstan is the strange core of traditionalist Catholicism," Catholic writer Ross Douthat stated in 2018.

Baháʼí Faith 

The Baháʼí Faith in Kazakhstan began during the policy of oppression of religion in the former Soviet Union. Before that time, Kazakhstan, as part of the Russian Empire, would have had indirect contact with the Baháʼí Faith as far back as 1847. Following the entrance of Baháʼí pioneers the community grew to be the largest religious community after Islam and Christianity, though only a few percent of the nation. By 1994 the National Spiritual Assembly of Kazakhstan was elected and the community has begun to multiply its efforts across various interests. The Association of Religion Data Archives (relying on World Christian Encyclopedia) estimated some 7,000 Baháʼís in 2010.

Judaism 

Kazakh Jews have a long history. There are approximately 12,000 to 30,000 Jews in Kazakhstan, less than 1% of the population. Most Kazakh Jews are Ashkenazi and speak Russian.

Buddhism 

Buddhism has existed in Kazakhstan since the 17th century, which is evidenced by the ancient pagodas and temples discovered by scientists during excavations. At present, there are only two officially registered Buddhism organisations in Kazakhstan, one belongs to Won Buddhism that originated from Korea and the other organization belongs to Tibetan Buddhism.

Hinduism 

Hindus in Kazakhstan are mainly composed of the ISKCON sect and Diaspora Hindus from India. 
There were about 801 Hindus in Kazakhstan in 2010 according to ARDA.

Pagan 
Slavic Neopaganism

Tengrism 

Tengrism is a Central Asian religion characterized by shamanism, animism, totemism, poly- and monotheism and ancestor worship. It was the prevailing religion of the Turks, Mongols, Hungarians, Xiongnu and Huns, and the religion of the five ancient Turkic states: Göktürk Khaganate, Western Turkic Khaganate, Great Bulgaria, Bulgarian Empire and Eastern Tourkia (Khazaria). In Irk Bitig, Tengri is mentioned as Türük Tängrisi (God of Turks).

Tengrists view their existence as sustained by the eternal blue sky (Tengri), the fertile mother-earth spirit (Umay) and a ruler regarded as the holy spirit of the sky. Heaven, earth, spirits of nature and ancestors provide for every need and protect all humans. By living an upright, respectful life, a human will keep his world in balance and perfect his personal Wind Horse, or spirit. The Huns of the northern Caucasus reportedly believed in two gods: Tangri Han (or Tengri Khan), considered identical to the Persian Aspandiat and for whom horses were sacrificed, and Kuar (whose victims are struck by lightning). Tengrism is practised in Sakha, Buryatia, Tuva and Mongolia in parallel with Tibetan Buddhism and Burkhanism.

Freedom of religion and religious tolerance 

Kazakhstan has a very diverse and stable religious background. However, some reported occurrences of persecution against Hare Krishnas and Jehovah's Witnesses for proselytizing have raised concern in the international community.

Article 22 of the Constitution of the Republic of Kazakhstan states that "everyone has the right to a freedom of conscience.” On May 18, 2011, the President of Kazakhstan adopted a decree establishing the Agency for Religious Affairs. The mission of the Agency is to coordinate interaction between the government, religious groups and civil society in order to ensure religious freedom in Kazakhstan.

In 2003 Kazakhstan established Congress of Leaders of World and Traditional Religions that aims to facilitate religious dialogue ensuring inter-religious tolerance and freedom in Kazakhstan.

Regional distribution 
As of the 2021 census:

Religion by ethnic group 
The 2009 census yielded the following results of Kazakhstan's population by religion and ethnic group.

See also 
Demographics of Kazakhstan

References